Jaguar Land Rover Engine Manufacturing Centre, is an engine producing factory located on the outskirts of Wolverhampton and South Staffordshire. It is strategically built adjacent to the M54 motorway on the i54 business park. Opened in 2014 by Her Majesty, it currently produces Ingenium petrol and diesel engines.

Having already been expanded once in the past, in 2015 it was announced that Jaguar Land Rover would spend £450 million on doubling the size of the engine plant. Once complete, the factory's workforce will increase from 700 to 1,400 people.

Solar Panels
The engine assembly plant is fitted with over 21,000 photovoltaic panels, which produce 5.8MW of energy. This accounts for more than 30% of the plant's energy requirements. The panels have enough energy to power more than 1,600 homes and reduce the plant's carbon footprint by over 2,400 tonnes per year.

References

Jaguar Land Rover